Kansas's 35th Senate district is one of 40 districts in the Kansas Senate. It has been represented by Republican Rick Wilborn since a 2014 special election.

Geography
District 35 covers the rural geographical center of the state to the north of Wichita, including all of Chase, Ellsworth, Marion, McPherson, and Morris Counties and parts of Dickinson and Rice Counties. Communities in the district include McPherson, Hillsboro, Ellsworth, Lyons, Lindsborg, Sterling, Marion, Council Grove, Herington, and Moundridge.

The district is located entirely within Kansas's 1st congressional district, and overlaps with the 68th, 70th, 73rd, 74th, 108th, 113th, and 114th districts of the Kansas House of Representatives.

Recent election results

2020

2016

2014 special

2012

Federal and statewide results in District 35

References

35
Chase County, Kansas
Dickinson County, Kansas
Ellsworth County, Kansas
McPherson County, Kansas
Marion County, Kansas
Morris County, Kansas
Rice County, Kansas